The men's 400 metres hurdles event at the 1988 World Junior Championships in Athletics was held in Sudbury, Ontario, Canada, at Laurentian University Stadium on 27, 28 and 29 July.

Medalists

Results

Final
29 July

Semifinals
28 July

Semifinal 1

Semifinal 2

Heats
27 July

Heat 1

Heat 2

Heat 3

Heat 4

Participation
According to an unofficial count, 29 athletes from 24 countries participated in the event.

References

400 metres hurdles
400 metres hurdles at the World Athletics U20 Championships